Václav Skoumal (born 28 May 1944) is a Czech gymnast. He competed in eight events at the 1968 Summer Olympics.

References

1944 births
Living people
Czech male artistic gymnasts
Olympic gymnasts of Czechoslovakia
Gymnasts at the 1968 Summer Olympics
Sportspeople from Zlín